Tetragonoderus sivianus is a species of beetle in the family Carabidae. It was described by Liebke in 1951.

References

Beetles described in 1951
sivianus